Buck is a surname. Notable people with the surname include:

Arts and entertainment
David Buck (1936–1989), British actor
Detlev Buck (born 1962), German film director
Dudley Buck (1839–1909), American composer
John E. Buck (born 1946), American sculptor and printmaker
Julie Buck (born 1974), American artist and photographer
Margaret Warriner Buck (1857–1929), American botanical artist
Mary K. Buck (1849-1901), Bohemian-born American author
Nathaniel Buck (died 1759/1774), English engraver and printmaker, brother of Samuel Buck
Pearl S. Buck (1892–1973), American novelist 
Percy Buck (1871–1947), English musician
Peter Buck (born 1956), American musician
Rinker Buck (born 1950), American author
Rob Buck (1958–2000), American guitarist and songwriter
Samantha Buck (born 1974), American actress
Samuel Buck (1696–1779), English engraver and printmaker, brother of Nathaniel Buck 
Tara Buck (born 1975), American actress
Zechariah Buck (1798–1879), English organist and choirmaster

Politics, law, and government
Antony Buck (1928–2003), British politician
Clarence F.  Buck (1870–1944), American politician and businessman
C. Douglass Buck (1890–1965), American engineer and politician, Governor and Senator of Delaware
Daniel Buck (1753–1816), United States Representative from Vermont
Daniel Buck (judge) (1829–1905), American jurist and politician
Ed Buck (born 1954), American Democrat political activist and fundraiser
 Edward Charles Buck (1838–1916), British civil servant (Indian Civil Service)
Frank Buck (Tennessee politician) (born 1943), American politician
George L. Buck (1866–1939), American politician
John R. Buck (1835–1917), United States congressman
Ken Buck (born 1959), American politician
Leonard W. Buck (1834–1895), American businessman, rancher and politician
Peter Buck (mayor) (died 1625), English mayor and naval official
Peter Henry Buck or Te Rangi Hīroa (1877–1951), New Zealand doctor, military leader, health administrator, politician, anthropologist and museum director
Tim Buck (1891–1973), long-time leader of the Communist Party of Canada
Tom Buck (1938–2020), American lawyer and politician
Walt Buck (1930–2013), Canadian politician

Science, mathematics, and medicine
Dudley Allen Buck (1927–1959), American scientist, engineer, educator, and inventor
Gurdon Buck (1807–1877), American surgeon, performed first clinical photograph, contributed to numerous fields of surgery
Peter Henry Buck or Te Rangi Hīroa (1877–1951), New Zealand doctor, military leader, health administrator, politician, anthropologist and museum director
Robert Creighton Buck (1920–1998), American mathematician

Sports
Bill Buck (cricketer) (born 1946), English cricketer
Bill Buck (footballer) (1900–1980), Australian footballer
Bob Buck (1938–1996), American sportscaster
Craig Buck (born 1958), American former volleyball player
David Buck (footballer) (1946–1996), English footballer
Fred Buck (1880–1952), British football player
Gilles Buck (born 1935), French sailor who competed in the 1968 Summer Olympics
Harold Buck, British rugby league footballer
Harry Buck (1884–1943), American coach and physical education instructor
Jack Buck (1924–2002), American sportscaster
Joe Buck (born 1969), American sportscaster
John Buck (baseball player) (born 1980), American baseball player
Richard Buck (born 1986), English sprinter
Travis Buck (born 1983), American baseball player
Mike Buck (born 1967), American football player
William Buck (baseball), American baseball player and umpire

Other fields
Bill Buck (environmentalist), American environmentalist and producer
Carl Darling Buck (1866–1955), American linguist
Carrie Buck (1906–1983), unsuccessful plaintiff in Buck v. Bell, which upheld compulsory sterilization
David J. Buck, United States Air Force general
Frank Buck (animal collector) (1884–1950), American hunter, animal collector, and film director
George Buck (1560–1622), English antiquarian
Jim Buck (dog walker) (1931–2013), American dog walker
Paul Herman Buck (1899–1978), American historian
Peter Buck (restaurateur) (1930–2021), American restaurateur and philanthropist
Robbie Buck (born 1972), Australian radio announcer
Robert N. Buck (1914–2007), American aviator
Solon J. Buck (1884–1962), Archivist of the United States
William Buck (translator) (1933–1970), American writer who produced English versions of the Mahabharata and Ramayana

See also
 Justice Buck (disambiguation)

English-language surnames